Lynda Lee Shea (née Mead; born April 17, 1939) is an American businesswoman and beauty pageant titleholder who was Miss Mississippi 1959 and Miss America 1960. Shea attended Natchez High School and the University of Mississippi, where she was a member of Chi Omega sorority. Her immediate predecessor as Miss America, Mary Ann Mobley (the first Miss America from Mississippi), was Mead's sorority sister at Chi Omega.

Family
Mead married Dr. John J. Shea Jr. in 1964; they have three adult children. Dr. Shea died in 2015.

Business life
Shea is president of Shea Design & French Country Imports in Memphis, Tennessee.

References

1939 births
Living people
American businesspeople
People from Memphis, Tennessee
People from Natchez, Mississippi
Miss America 1960s delegates
Miss America winners
University of Mississippi alumni
Miss Mississippi winners
20th-century American people